Teresa Alcocer was a prolific Spanish film editor who worked in the industry from the 1940s through the 1990s.

Selected filmography 

 The Long Winter (1992)
 Deadly Deception (1991)
 Dragón Rapide (1986)
 The Long Holidays of 1936 (1976)
 Watch Out Gringo! Sabata Will Return (1972)
 The Boldest Job in the West (1972)
 Umbracle (1970)
 Spain Again (1969)
 The Day the Hot Line Got Hot (1968)
 Twice a Judas (1968)
 Professionals for a Massacre (1967)
 Superargo contro Diabolikus (1966)
 The Texican (1966)
 Sicario 77, vivo o morto (1966)
 Dollar of Fire (1966)
 One Hundred Thousand Dollars for Ringo (1965)
 Desperate Mission (1965)
 Man from Canyon City (1965)
 Guns of Nevada (1965)
 Agent 3S3: Passport to Hell (1965)
 Five Thousand Dollars on One Ace (1965)
 Ranch of the Ruthless (1965)
 The Italians They Are Crazy (1958)

References

External links 

 

Spanish women film editors
Spanish film editors